Amelia Muir Baldwin (December 25, 1876 – October 31, 1960) was an American interior decorator who earned a nationwide reputation for her tapestry needlework design. From 1913 to 1919 she designed and decorated booths for Boston suffrage bazaars. She is best known for running an interior design and needle tapestry business in Boston, Massachusetts in the early 20th century and as well as her association with the Women's Suffrage Movement at the time.

Baldwin died on October 31, 1960, at her home in Boston.

References

External links
Papers of Amelia Muir Baldwin, 1821-1961: A Finding Aid. Schlesinger Library, Radcliffe Institute, Harvard University.

American interior designers
American artisans
1876 births
1960 deaths
American women interior designers
Radcliffe College alumni
Tapestry artists
20th-century American educators
American textile artists
Educators from Massachusetts
20th-century American women educators